A Mother Superior is a prioress or abbess: the nun in charge of a religious community. 

Mother Superior may also refer to:

Music 
 Mother Superior, an English all-female progressive rock band formed in 1974
 Mother Superior (band), an American rock band 1993–2011
 "Mother Superior", a song by Good Riddance from the 1995 album For God and Country
 "Mother Superior", a song by Katzenjammer from the 2008 album Le Pop
 "Mother Superior", a song by Coheed and Cambria from the 2007 album Good Apollo, I'm Burning Star IV, Volume Two: No World for Tomorrow
 "Mother Superior", a song by Hurricane #1 from the 1997 album Hurricane 1

Fictional characters
 Mother Superior, alias of Marvel Comics character Sin
 Mother Superior, nickname of Johnny Swann in the novel Trainspotting

See also

 Superior (hierarchy)